Liliane Maestrini (born 26 October 1987) is a Brazilian beach volleyball player.

She won bronze medals at the 2013 World Championships alongside her teammate Bárbara Seixas and the 2015 Pan American Games alongside Carolina Horta.

She is the 2007 World U21 Champion and has reached the podium in several FIVB Beach Volleyball World Tour tournaments.

Personal life
In August 2013, Liliane married fellow female player Larissa França.

References

External links
 
 

1987 births
Living people
Brazilian women's beach volleyball players
Brazilian people of Italian descent
Beach volleyball players at the 2015 Pan American Games
Pan American Games bronze medalists for Brazil
Lesbian sportswomen
Brazilian LGBT sportspeople
LGBT volleyball players
Pan American Games medalists in volleyball
People from Vitória, Espírito Santo
Medalists at the 2015 Pan American Games
Sportspeople from Espírito Santo